The Union of South Africa competed at the 1952 Summer Olympics in Helsinki, Finland. 64 competitors, 60 men and 4 women, took part in 59 events in 13 sports.

Medalists

Gold
 Esther Brand — Athletics, Women's High Jump 
 Joan Harrison — Swimming, Women's 100m Backstroke

Silver
 Daphne Hasenjager — Athletics, Women's 100 metres
 Theunis van Schalkwyk — Boxing, Men's Light Middleweight 
 George Estman, Robert Fowler, Thomas Shardelow, and Alfred Swift — Cycling, Men's 4.000m Team Pursuit 
 Raymond Robinson and Thomas Shardelow — Cycling, Men's 2.000m Tandem

Bronze
 Willie Toweel — Boxing, Men's Flyweight 
 Leonard Leisching — Boxing, Men's Featherweight
 Andries Nieman — Boxing, Men's Heavyweight
 Raymond Robinson — Cycling, Men's 1.000m Time Trial

Athletics

Boxing

Cycling

Road Competition
Men's Individual Road Race (190.4 km)
George Estman — did not finish (→ no ranking)
Alfred Swift — did not finish (→ no ranking)
Robert Fowler — did not finish (→ no ranking)

Track Competition
Men's 1.000m Time Trial
Raymond Robinson
 Final — 1:13.0 (→  Bronze Medal)

Men's 1.000m Sprint Scratch Race
Raymond Robinson — 5th place

Men's 4.000m Team Pursuit
Alfred Swift, George Estman, Robert Fowler, and Thomas Shardelow  
 Final — Lost to Italy (→  Silver Medal)

Diving

Men's 3m Springboard
Willem Welgemoed
 Preliminary Round — 61.64 points (→ 22nd place)

Gymnastics

Modern pentathlon

One male pentathlete represented South Africa in 1952.

 Harry Schmidt

Rowing

South Africa had five male rowers participate in two out of seven rowing events in 1952.

 Men's single sculls
 Ian Stephen

 Men's coxless four
 Don Dyke-Wells
 Damian Nichol
 John Webb
 Christopher Veitch

Sailing

Shooting

One shooter represented South Africa in 1952.

50 m rifle, prone
 William Murless

Swimming

Water polo

Weightlifting

Wrestling

References

External links
Official Olympic Reports
International Olympic Committee results database

Nations at the 1952 Summer Olympics
1952
1952 in South African sport